Shanghai Shentong Metro Group Co., Ltd. known as Shentong Metro Group is the operator of Shanghai Metro and Shanghai Maglev Train, as well as the parent company of the listed company Shanghai Shentong Metro Co., Ltd. It is currently responsible for the operation of Shanghai Metro. This includes investment, financing and operation management, and owns most of the assets of Shanghai Metro. The name is derived from Shen is the alternative name of Shanghai, while Tong literally means transportation.

Parent and owner
Shentong Metro Group is a subsidiary of Shanghai Jiushi Group (for 66.57% stake), a state-owned enterprise. The minority interests (33.43% stake) was owned by another Shanghai state-owned enterprise Shanghai Municipal Investment Group (also known as Shanghai Chengtou (Group) Co., Ltd.). 

Shentong Metro Group was established on 28 April 2000 with a registered capital was 26 billion yuan (Shanghai Jiushi Company invested 60%: 15.6 billion yuan; Shanghai Municipal Investment Group invested 40%: 10.4 billion yuan).

In 2001 the Shanghai Municipal People 's Government approved the "Shanghai Municipal People's Government's Approval in Principle of the Municipal Planning Commission and the Municipal Construction Commission's Opinions on Improving the "Four-Separate" System of Shanghai Rail Transit" (Hu Fu [2001] No. 13): Shentong Metro Group is the representative of the municipal government's investment in rail transit, as the municipal-level investor in the construction of Shanghai's rail transit network, undertakes the investment and financing functions of the Shanghai government in the field of rail transit. As a consequence, on 29 June 2001 Shentong Metro Group acquired Shanghai Lingqiao Tap Water Co., Ltd. and renamed it on 25 July 2001 to Shanghai Shentong Metro Co., Ltd.

The company received huge subsidies in order to provide affordable transport in Shanghai.

Subsidiaries
Since 2014, after the internal reorganization, Shentong Metro Group has the following subsidiaries:
 Shanghai Shentong Metro Co., Ltd. (58.34%)
 6 operation companies (see list below)
 23 line asset companies (see list below)
 Shanghai Metro Maintenance Branch with subsidiaries: 
 Vehicle Branch 
 CRSC Branch
 Shanghai Metro Operation Center Ticket Management Department
 Shanghai Metro Power Supply Branch
 Asset Investment Management Company
 Shentong Metro Construction Group

Shentong Metro
Shanghai Shentong Metro Co., Ltd known as Shentong Metro is listed on the Shanghai Stock Exchange with stock code: . Shentong Metro Group is the major shareholder with 58.43% of the shares. Shentong Metro became the first listed company in mainland China to engage in rail transit investment and operation. At present, the company consists of the headquarters and 4 subordinate subsidiaries:
 Shanghai Keolis Public Transport Operation Management Co. Ltd. (established on 30 June 2014). A joint venture with Keolis (owning 49% of the shares).
 Sichuan Development Shanghai Keolis Public Transport Operation Management Co., Ltd., with a registered capital of 50 million yuan, Shanghai Keolis holds 51% of the shares, and Sichuan Railway Transportation holds 49% of the shares. It will operate is the Dujiangyan MTR passenger line with expected opening November 2022.
 Shanghai Metro Financial Leasing Co., Ltd. (established on 30 October 2013).
 Shanghai Metro New Energy Co., Ltd. (established on 25 December 2018).
 Shanghai Shentong Jianheng Rail Transit Testing and Certification Co., Ltd. (established on 16 January 2019). A joint venture with Beijing Jianheng Certification Center Co., Ltd. each owning 50% of the shares.

The predecessor of Shentong Metro, Shanghai Lingqiao Tap Water Co., Ltd., was established on 12 June 1992. On 24 February 1994 it was listed on the Shanghai Stock Exchange. Up to 2001 the Lingqiao Tap Water Co., Ltd. was responsible for (besides water supply) rail transit construction, and there was no separate project company responsible for construction and project investment. On 29 June 2001 a major asset restructuring took place:
 Lingqiao Water Plant was sold to Shanghai Water Supply Pudong Co., Ltd. (a wholly-owned subsidiary of Shanghai Municipal Investment Group) based on the appraised value of RMB 218.0549 million;
 The 117 million yuan stake (38 million shares) in Shanghai Pudong Development Bank Co., Ltd was sold to Shanghai Municipal Investment Group;
 The September 2000 investment and participation in 20.5 million shares (20.5%) of Shanghai Public Transport Card Co., Ltd. was terminated and the advance payment of 22.55 million yuan was recovered; 
 The transfer of 40 million shares of Shanghai Dazhong Insurance Co., Ltd. was terminated and the advance payment of 51.6 million yuan was recovered;
 It returned the shares of Shanghai Jianfu Investment Co., Ltd. and recovered 30 million yuan of equity investment;
 The municipal government decided to transfer 63.65% of the shares of Shanghai Lingqiao Tap Water Co., Ltd. shares held by Shanghai Municipal Investment Group to Shanghai Shentong Group Co., Ltd. for the transaction price of RMB 801.7436 million.
 Shanghai Lingqiao Tap Water Co., Ltd. and Shentong Metro Group signed the "Agreement on the Transfer of Operation Rights of Metro Line 1", and Shentong Group agreed to transfer the operation rights of Line 1 (Xinzhuang to Shanghai Railway Station only) to Shanghai Lingqiao Tap Water Co., Ltd. for the period from 29 June 2001 to 28 June 2011 free of charge. This was extended to 30 June 2021. 

On 25 July 2001 the operating assets such as all 18 trains of Metro Line 1, the ticket sales system and a 51% stake in Shanghai Metro Advertising Company (established 7 October 1992) (registered capital of 1 million yuan, mainly engaged in station light box advertisements, train advertisements, subway ticket advertisements, station broadcast advertisements) were officially renamed as Shanghai Shentong Metro Co., Ltd. 

In 2013, with the establishment of the company's wholly-owned subsidiary "Shanghai Shentong Metro Line 1 Development Co., Ltd.", the company injected the business of Metro Line 1 into this subsidiary. At the same time, with the written consent of Shentong Metro Group, Shanghai Metro Line 1 management right was transferred to Shanghai No. 1 Metro Operation Co. Ltd.. 

Shentong Metro Group was planned to inject real estate assets to the listed subsidiary Shentong Metro in 2017. However, the plan was scrapped in June 2017.

On 24 May 2019, the company completed a major asset restructuring, sold Shanghai Shentong Metro Line 1 Development Co., Ltd. (valued at 1.767 billion yuan) to Shentong Metro Group, and acquired from Shentong Metro Group the 51% of Shanghai Keolis Public Transportation Operation Management Co., Ltd. (100% valued at 104 million yuan; 51% valued at 53.04 million yuan). The transaction was completed with cash consideration.

Operation companies
The subsidiaries are responsible for the operation of different lines and different sections. All operation companies are fully subsidiaries of Shentong Metro Group, except Shanghai Keolis which is 51% owned by Shanghai Shentong Metro Co., Ltd. and the other 49% of shares are owned by Keolis.

Line asset companies
The line development company is responsible for the investment, construction, operation and management of the projects of each line, as well as the comprehensive development of the station area along the line (operating with a license for licensed operation). All companies are subsidiaries of Shentong Metro Group, except Kunshan Rail Transit Investment Development Co., Ltd. which owns the assets of the Kunshan segment (Anting - Huaqiao) of line 11 of which the parent company is Kunshan Transportation Development Holding Group Co., Ltd.

Notes

References

External links
  

Chinese companies established in 2000
Railway companies established in 2000
Companies based in Shanghai
Shanghai Metro
Transport in Shanghai
Companies owned by the provincial government of China
Railway companies of China
Real estate companies of China
Rail transport in Shanghai